Lidya Buzio (1948 – September 30, 2014) was an Uruguayan-born American ceramist.

Born in Montevideo, she studied with artists of the Taller Torres-Garcia in that city before moving to New York City in 1971; in the 1990s she moved again, to the North Fork of Long Island. She crafted mainly burnished black pots onto which she would paint scenes of New York rooftops. 

An example of her work is in the collection of the Smithsonian American Art Museum; other museums with pieces in their collections include the Arizona State University Art Museum; the Berkeley Art Museum; the Brooklyn Museum; the Everson Museum of Art; the Hallmark Art Collection; the Honolulu Academy of Art; the Long Beach Museum of Art; the Los Angeles County Museum of Art; the M. H. de Young Memorial Museum; the Museum of Fine Arts, Houston; the Taipei Fine Arts Museum; the National Taiwan Museum of Fine Arts; the National Museum of History; the Nelson-Atkins Museum of Art; the Nerman Museum of Contemporary Art; the Racine Art Museum; the Rhode Island School of Design Museum; the Spencer Museum of Art; the University of Iowa Museum of Art; and the Victoria & Albert Museum. Buzio died of cancer at her home in Greenport, Long Island.

References

1948 births
2014 deaths
American women ceramists
American ceramists
20th-century American artists
20th-century ceramists
20th-century American women artists
21st-century American artists
21st-century ceramists
21st-century American women artists
People from Montevideo
Artists from New York (state)
Uruguayan emigrants to the United States
Deaths from cancer in New York (state)